Jacob Praetorius (I) or Jacob Praetorius the Elder (c. 1520 in Magdeburg – 1586 in Hamburg) was a German organist and composer. He was the father of Hieronymus Praetorius and the grandfather of Jacob Praetorius the Younger, both also composers.

Life
Little is known about his life. He probably studied under Martin Agricola. From 1555 until his death he was the organist and church-composer at two churches in Hamburg. In 1554 he published a collection of choral works. In 1566 he published a collection of 200 works by Dutch and German composers under the title Opus musicum excellens et novum - only one of those works (a Te Deum in four parts) is by Praetorius himself, of which only the first part has survived. A Veni in hortum meum a 4 has also survived, either by Jacob Praetorius the Elder or his grandson Jacob Praetorius the Younger.

External links
Works by and about Jacob Praetorius (I) in the Deutschen Nationalbibliothek

1520 births
1586 deaths

Year of birth uncertain
German male organists
German classical composers
16th-century German composers
Musicians from Magdeburg
Classical composers of church music
Renaissance composers
German male classical composers